Kay Kawad (also known as Kay Qobad, Avestan 𐬐𐬀𐬎𐬎𐬌 𐬐𐬀𐬎𐬎𐬁𐬙𐬀  Kauui Kauuāta) is a mythological figure of Iranian folklore and oral tradition. The 'Kay' stock epithet identifies Kawad as a Kayanian, a mythological dynasty that in tradition Kay Kawad was also the founder of.

In the tradition preserved in the Shahnameh, Kay Kawad was a descendant of Manuchehr, and lived in the Alborz mountains, and was brought to the Estaxr (the capital) by Rustam. Then however, Kawad defeats Afrasiyab in personal combat, and for this feat and because he possesses the  he is elected king by the Iranians, and the descendants of Nowzar—Zou, Garshasp and Gastham—pay him allegiance.

Sources and references

 Abolqasem Ferdowsi, Dick Davis trans. (2006), Shahnameh: The Persian Book of Kings , modern English translation (abridged), current standard
 Warner, Arthur and Edmond Warner, (translators) The Shahnama of Firdausi, 9 vols. (London: Keegan Paul, 1905-1925) (complete English verse translation)
 Shirzad Aghaee, Nam-e kasan va ja'i-ha dar Shahnama-ye Ferdousi (Personalities and Places in the Shahnama of Ferdousi, Nyköping, Sweden, 1993.
 Jalal Khāleghi Motlagh, Editor, The Shahnameh, to be published in 8 volumes (ca. 500 pages each), consisting of six volumes of text and two volumes of explanatory notes. See: Center for Iranian Studies, Columbia University.

Kayanians
Shahnameh characters
Zoroastrian rulers